William Molloy (born 1904) was an English footballer who played for Celtic, Dumbarton, Yeovil & Petters United, Swansea Town, Bristol City, and Falkirk.

References

1904 births
Year of death missing
Association football inside forwards
English footballers
Celtic F.C. players
Dumbarton F.C. players
Yeovil Town F.C. players
Swansea City A.F.C. players
Bristol City F.C. players
Falkirk F.C. players
Scottish Football League players
Southern Football League players
English Football League players
Date of birth missing